Just Before the Rain was a play created in the aftermath of the 2001 Oldham race riots. Commissioned by Peshkar Productions, it was a devised piece involving local performers directed by Iain Bloomfield.

Tour
The play was initially created for the Cultureshock at the 2002 Commonwealth Games, and had a sole performance at the Contact Theatre in 2002. In 2003, the play was toured to the following venues:

 Contact Theatre, 13–15 February
 Octagon Theatre, Bolton, 17–19 February
 Darwen Library Theatre, 20 February
 King George's Hall, Blackburn, 23 February
 Theatre in the Mill, Bradford, 4–5 March
 Gateway Theatre, Chester, 18–21 March
 Live Theatre Company, 3–5 April
 Sherman Cymru, 8–9 April
 Lawrence Batley Theatre, 22–23 May
 Watermans Arts Centre, 8–10 May
 Oldham Coliseum Theatre, 13 May
 Phoenix Arts Centre, 16–17 May

Original cast
Jaheda Choudury, Anjub Ali, Aklakur Rahman, Mahmood Ali and Shahena Choudhury.

References

External links
 
 
 

2002 plays
British plays
English plays